Anthony James Clarke, Baron Clarke of Hampstead, CBE (called Tony; born 17 April 1932) is an English trade unionist and Labour Party politician.

Union roles
A former telegraph boy and postman, in 1979 Clarke became a full-time official of the Union of Postal Workers, which in 1980 became the Union of Communication Workers (UCW).
He edited the UPW journal "The Post" in 1979, and served as the UCW's Deputy General Secretary from 1981 to 1993.

Labour Party chairmanship
Clarke was a member of the Labour Party's National Executive Committee from 1983 to 1993, and served as Chairman of The Labour Party from 1992 to 1993.

House of Lords
He was appointed a Commander of the Order of the British Empire (CBE) in the 1998 New Year Honours. He was created a life peer on 29 July 1998, as Baron Clarke of Hampstead, of Hampstead in the London Borough of Camden.  He chaired the Taskforce established to investigate the causes of the disturbances in Burnley in 2001.
After a period of being on leave of absence he returned to the Lords in April 2022.

References

External links
Communication Workers Union
House of Lords
Hansard

1932 births
Living people
Labour Party (UK) life peers
English trade unionists
Chairs of the Labour Party (UK)
Commanders of the Order of the British Empire
Life peers created by Elizabeth II